Tonb may refer to:
TonB, see Outer Membrane Receptor
Tonb Baluchan, Iran
Tonb Bariku, Iran
Tonb Basat, Iran
Tonb-e Khvajeh Bahman, Iran
Tunb (disambiguation), places in Iran